The Bulletin for Spanish and Portuguese Historical Studies is a peer review academic journal of the Association for Spanish and Portuguese Historical Studies.
The current editor is Andrew H. Lee (New York University).

References 

Academic journals associated with international learned and professional societies of Europe